SV Gonsenheim is a German association football club from the district of Gonsenheim in the city of Mainz, Rhineland-Palatinate. It was established in 1919 as Fußball-Klub Viktoria Gonsenheim and on 14 September 1919 merged with Fußball-Club Germania 1915 Gonsenheim to form Sportverein Gonsenheim.



History
Following World War II, sports and football clubs across the country were disbanded by occupying Allied authorities as part of the process of denazification. A new club known as Sportgemeinde Gonsenheim was formed out of the former memberships of SV and Turnverein Gonsenheim in 1946. The team was part of the postwar first division Oberliga Südwest-Nord where they played just two seasons as a lower tier side before choosing to leave the top-flight. In 1949, SV and TV split to become separate clubs again.

In the late 1960s, SV broke through to the third tier Amateurliga Südwest where they played 5 seasons between 1964–71. In 2003, they were promoted to the Verbandsliga Südwest (V) and earned a strong third-place finish in their first season there. However, it would not be until 2010 that SV would advance to the Oberliga Südwest (V), a league renamed to Oberliga Rheinland-Pfalz/Saar in 2012.

Honours
The club's honours:
 Verbandsliga Südwest
 Champions: 2010
 Landesliga Südwest
 Champions: 2005

Recent seasons
The recent season-by-season performance of the club:

With the introduction of the Regionalligas in 1994 and the 3. Liga in 2008 as the new third tier, below the 2. Bundesliga, all leagues below dropped one tier. In 2012 the Oberliga Südwest was renamed Oberliga Rheinland-Pfalz/Saar.

References

External links
 Official team site
 SV Gonsenheim at Weltfussball.de
 Das deutsche Fußball-Archiv historical German domestic league tables 

Football clubs in Germany
Football clubs in Rhineland-Palatinate
Association football clubs established in 1919
1919 establishments in Germany